Lau Spel (20 July 1900 – 29 December 1979) was a Dutch hurdler. He competed in the 110 metres hurdles at the 1924 Summer Olympics and the 1928 Summer Olympics.

References

External links
 

1900 births
1979 deaths
Athletes (track and field) at the 1924 Summer Olympics
Athletes (track and field) at the 1928 Summer Olympics
Dutch male hurdlers
Olympic athletes of the Netherlands
Place of birth missing